Ekaterine "Eka" Tkeshelashvili (born May 23, 1977) is a Georgian jurist and politician, formerly serving as Minister of Justice, Minister of Foreign Affairs, Secretary of the National Security Council, and Deputy Prime Minister and State Minister for Reintegration of Georgia under President Mikheil Saakashvili.

Biography 
Tkeshelashvili was born on May 23, 1977 in Tbilisi, the capital of what was then Georgian SSR (now Georgia). She graduated from the Faculty of International Law and International Relations at Tbilisi State University in 1999 and worked as a lawyer for the International Committee of the Red Cross, Georgia, and then for IRIS Georgia, a Tbilisi office of the University of Maryland’s Center for Institutional Reform and the Informal Sector. From October 9, 1997 until September 10, 1999, she was the Chief Specialist Centre for Foreign Policy Research and Analysis in the Ministry of Foreign Affairs of Georgia. From June 1 to November 1, 2001, Tkeshelashvili was a lawyer at Lawyers' Committee of Human Rights in New York City, from December 2002 until May 2003, interned at the International Criminal Tribunal for the former Yugoslavia in the Hague, Netherlands. She is a Senior Network Member at the European Leadership Network (ELN).

Political career
Tkeshelashvili was appointed to her first government post as Deputy Minister of Justice of Georgia on February 1, 2004. She was then appointed Deputy Minister of Interior on September 1, 2005 and then became a Chairperson of the Tbilisi Court of Appeals from May 1, 2006 to August 1, 2007. 

She served as Minister of Justice of Georgia from August 2007 to January 2008, and as Prosecutor General of Georgia from January to May 2008. On May 5, 2008 she was appointed Minister of Foreign Affairs, a post she held until December 5, 2008. Her appointment coincided with Georgia's increasingly tense relations with its northern neighbor Russia over the breakaway regions of Abkhazia and South Ossetia, and Georgia's aspiration to join NATO. During her tenure in this position, she vowed to pursue active diplomacy to find a peaceful solution to all existing problems. Tkeshelashvili was replaced as Minister of Foreign Affairs by Grigol Vashadze on December 5, 2008, in a cabinet shuffle. Later in December, she was appointed to head the National Security Council. From 2010 to 2012, she was State Minister for Reintegration.

From 2017 Tkeshelashvili is Head of EU Anti-Corruption Initiative in Ukraine. She also teaches at Civil and Political School in Kyiv, and in the Black Sea University in Tbilisi.

Personal life
Tkeshelashvili is married and has two children. In addition to her native Georgian, she speaks English, Russian, and French.

References 

Women government ministers of Georgia (country)
1977 births
Living people
Female foreign ministers
Foreign Ministers of Georgia
Justice ministers of Georgia
Deputy Prime Ministers of Georgia
Attorneys general
Lawyers from Tbilisi
Politicians from Tbilisi
Tbilisi State University alumni
21st-century politicians from Georgia (country)
21st-century women politicians from Georgia (country)